Jonathan Bourdon (born 3 September 1981 in Biercee) is a Belgian professional footballer. He currently plays for R.O.C. de Charleroi-Marchienne.

References

Belgian footballers
1981 births
Living people

Association football goalkeepers
K.S.V. Roeselare players
K.V.C. Westerlo players